The Human Research Program (HRP) was created in October 2005 at Johnson Space Center (JSC) in response to NASA's desire to move human research project management away from headquarters to the JSC.  The HRP is an applied research and technology program that investigates and mitigates risks to astronaut health and performance in support of exploration missions and provides countermeasures and technologies for human space exploration.

Goals
The goals of the HRP are to provide knowledge and technology in order to mitigate risks to human health and performance and develop tools to enable safe and productive human space exploration. The Human Research Program also aims to educate the public on the challenges of human space flight.

Human Research Roadmap
The Human Research Roadmap (HRR) is a web-based tool that is used to communicate the content of the Integrated Research Plan (IRP). The IRP is utilized to identify the approach and research activities planned to address risks to human health and performance in space which are assigned to specific elements within the program.

This tool helps users to search for items such as gaps associated with risks, the tasks associated with a given gap, the cross-integration of a task across multiple gaps or risks, and deliverables associated with a gap or risk.

Evidence
Reviews of the accumulated evidence from medical records, space flight operations, and research findings are compiled into evidence reports. This evidence provides the basis for identifying the highest priority of risks to humans in space exploration, which comprise the risk portfolio within the HRP. It also provides the basis for identifying gaps and tasks in the research plan.

Risks
Risks include physiological effects of radiation, low gravity, terrestrial environments as well as unique challenges in medical support, human factors, and behavioral health support. Risks are identified in the Program Requirements Document (PRD) and assigned to an element within HRP to quantify, mitigate or monitor.

Gaps
For each risk, the HRP identifies gaps in knowledge about the risk and the ability to mitigate the risk. The degree of uncertainty in understanding the likelihood, consequence, and/or time frame of particular risk are the major factors that drive the gaps. Gaps in knowledge or risk mitigation often appear in multiple risks, and many of the specific research tasks address multiple gaps.

Tasks
Tasks partially or completely close a gap by better defining a risk or developing mitigation strategies to reduce the risk to an acceptable level. In some cases, a task can address multiple gaps across multiple risks.

Deliverables
Each task culminates in a deliverable or other agreed-upon end-product such as recommended standards, flight rules, processes, countermeasures and new technologies.

Elements
There are currently seven elements in the HRP:

References

External links 
 Human Research Project website 

Human spaceflight